Khariton Daurovich Agrba is a Russian professional boxer who has held the WBA Continental super-lightweight title since June. As an amateur he won a silver medal at the 2019 European Games.

Amateur career 
During an amateur career in which he compiled a record of 305–16, Agrba was a two-time runner up at the Russian National Championships; won gold medals at the 2016 World University Championships and 2018 Strandzha Cup; and silver medals at the 2019 European Games and 2019 Boxing World Cup.

Professional career
Agrba made his professional debut on 13 December 2019, scoring a six-round unanimous decision (UD) victory over Shokhrukh Abdiev at Manezh in Vladikavkaz, Russia.

He won his first professional title in his next fight, the WBA Fedecaribe welterweight title, after defeating Flavio Cesar Ramos via third-round stoppage by corner retirement (RTD) on 7 February 2020 at the Roberto Durán Arena in Panama City. He moved down in weight for his next fight, facing Manuk Dilanyan for the vacant WBA Continental super-lightweight title on 15 June 2020 at the Soviet Wings Sport Palace in Moscow. Agrba captured his second WBA regional title in a shutout UD victory, with all three judges scoring the bout 100–90.

Professional boxing record

References

External links

Russian people of Abkhazian descent
Living people
Year of birth missing (living people)
Date of birth missing (living people)
Russian male boxers
Light-welterweight boxers
Welterweight boxers
Southpaw boxers
Boxers at the 2019 European Games
European Games medalists in boxing
European Games silver medalists for Russia